A list of all Apple internal and external drives in chronological order of introduction.

Floppy disk drives
 Disk II
 Disk III
 Apple "Twiggy" FileWare
 Disk IIc
 400K Drive (internal)
 Macintosh External Disk Drive (400K)
 UniDisk
 DuoDisk
 UniDisk 3.5 
 Macintosh 800K External Drive
 Disk 5.25
 Apple 3.5 Drive
 Apple SuperDrive
 Macintosh HDI-20 External 1.4MB Drive

Hard disk drives
 Apple ProFile
 Apple Widget
 Macintosh Hard Disk 20
 Apple Hard Disk 20SC
 Xserve RAID
 Time Capsule

Optical drives
 AppleCD
 PowerCD
 SuperDrive
 Apple MacBook Air SuperDrive

Other drives
 Apple Tape Backup 40SC
 Fusion Drive

Drives
Drives
Drives
Apple drives

drives